The Mills House is a historic house at 200 West Searcy Street in Kensett, Arkansas.  It is a -story wood-frame structure, with an irregular roof line, weatherboard siding, and a brick foundation and porch posts.  The porch wraps around part of the front and side, and has a decorative brickwork balustrade.  Built in 1921, it is one of Kensett's finest examples of Craftsman architecture.

The house was listed on the National Register of Historic Places in 1991.

See also
Wilbur D. Mills
National Register of Historic Places listings in White County, Arkansas

References

Houses on the National Register of Historic Places in Arkansas
Houses completed in 1921
Houses in White County, Arkansas
National Register of Historic Places in White County, Arkansas
1921 establishments in Arkansas
Bungalow architecture in Arkansas
American Craftsman architecture in Arkansas